Nausibius clavicornis is a species of silvanid flat bark beetle in the family Silvanidae. It is found in Africa, Australia, the Caribbean Sea, Europe and Northern Asia (excluding China), Central America, North America, Oceania, South America, and Southern Asia.

References

Further reading

 
 

Silvanidae
Articles created by Qbugbot
Beetles described in 1794